Shingchang "Samuel" Kou (born in 1974) is a Chinese American statistician and Professor of Statistics at Harvard University.

Biography
He earned a bachelor's degree in computational mathematics at Peking University. He graduated in 1997 and then moved to the United States to study statistics at Stanford University under Bradley Efron. He earned his Ph.D. in 2001 and subsequently joined the statistics faculty at Harvard University.

In 2008, he became a full professor of statistics at Harvard.

Honors and awards
In 2007, he was elected a fellow of the American Statistical Association. In 2013, he was awarded a Guggenheim fellowship.

He received the COPSS Presidents' Award in 2012. The reason for receiving the award was described as follows:

Selected publications
 S. C. Kou, Qing Zhou, and  Wing Hung Wong. "Equi-energy sampler with applications in statistical inference and statistical mechanics". Annals of Statistics, 34(4), 1581–1619, 2006.

References

External links
 Faculty website
 

1974 births
Living people
American statisticians
Harvard University faculty
Peking University alumni
Stanford University alumni
Fellows of the American Statistical Association
People from Lanzhou